The East London Waterworks Company was one of eight private water companies in London absorbed by the Metropolitan Water Board in 1904.

The company was founded by Act of Parliament in 1806, and in 1845 the limits of supply were described as "all those portions of the Metropolis, and its suburbs, which lie to the east of the city, Shoreditch, the Kingsland Road, and Dalston; extending their mains even across the river Lea into Essex, as far as West Ham."

The company also acquired existing waterworks at Shadwell (dating from 1660) Lea Bridge (pre 1767) and West Ham (1743). Although the legislation that established the London water companies intended that they would compete for customers, in 1815 the East London company drew up a legal agreement with the New River Company defining a boundary between their areas of supply.

In 1829, the source of water was moved further up river to Lea Bridge as a result of pollution caused by population growth. In 1770, the Hackney Cut, had been built across Hackney Marshes to avoid a  meander of the natural river course; clean water was now abstracted from the natural channel to a new reservoir at Old Ford. In 1830 the company gained a lease on the existing reservoir at Clapton. This was replaced by a new reservoir at Stamford Hill in 1891.

In 1841 the company supplied 36,916 houses. By 1903 this figure had risen to 223,891 houses, with the area of supply having a population of 1,482,156.

In 1866, during a cholera pandemic outbreak, where 5,973 Londoners perished, the East London Water Company was found guilty of supplying contaminated water taken from River Lea and stored into open reservoirs. Dead eels were found in water pipes, and foul water taken from the reservoirs and pumped into the main supply.

The Metropolis Water Act 1902 amalgamated the eight private water companies into the Metropolitan Water Board, whose members were chosen by the various local authorities of the metropolitan area.

See also
London water supply infrastructure
Charles Greaves

References

London water infrastructure
Former buildings and structures in the London Borough of Hackney
History of the London Borough of Hackney
Former water company predecessors of Thames Water
1806 establishments in England
British companies established in 1806